In India, a Special Task Force (STF) is a type of police task force created to deal with certain problems. Every state has a power to constitute an STF. They are primarily formed due to lack of adequate police forces for a task, like neutralizing a major criminal or criminal network or as a counter-insurgency or anti-terrorism measure.

The states of Tamil Nadu and Karnataka first raised Special Task forces in the 1980s to counter ivory poacher, Veerapan, whom the forces eventually killed in 2004 with Operation Cocoon. In late 1980s, such forces were formed in Punjab to counter insurgency. An STF was also formed in 1998 to kill Shri Prakash Shukla.

Uttar Pradesh to kill Shri Prakash Shukla
An STF was first formed in 1998 by the Uttar Pradesh Police to kill Shri Prakash Shukla. Because at that time crime was at its peak in Uttar Pradesh.  In the 1990s Shri Prakash Shukla had become the biggest name of terror in Uttar Pradesh.The fear of Shri Prakash Shukla in the 90s was such that even the police used to go out of his way. Shukla had driven AK-47 for the first time on the soil of Uttar Pradesh in 1996. So the first time in Uttar Pradesh STF was formed. Shri Prakash Shukla is still considered as the biggest don of Uttar Pradesh. The extortion and other illegal activities were at its all-time high. The STF proved to be very successful in capturing criminals and controlling crimes in UP. Since then it has been an integral part of UP police.

The special Task Force of UP Police was created vide GO No. 1889 (1) VI-Pu-2-98-1100 (35) dated 4.5.98 of UP Government for the following objectives:

 Collection of Intelligence about Mafia gangs and Intelligence based action against such gangs.
 Preparation of action plan and its execution against Disruptive Elements specially ISI agents.
 Action against listed gangs in coordination with the district police.
 Effective action against gang of dacoits, especially inter-district gangs.
 Effective action against inter-district gangs of Organized criminals.

With the creation of the ATS, charter no 2, i.e., action for prevention of disruptive activities especially ISI agents have been transferred to the ATS.

The STF is headed by an Additional Director General rank officer, who is assisted by an Inspector General of Police. The STF works as teams, with each team headed by either an Additional SP or Deputy SP. The SSP is in charge of all the operations conducted by the STF. STF has a pan-UP jurisdiction. Its teams also operate outside the state, with the assistance of respective State police.

UP STF relies extensively upon human intelligence, technology, and sophisticated tactics to achieve its objectives. Over its short lifetime of about 15 years, UP STF has an enviable history of boasting of 81 Police Medals of Gallantry awarded by the President of India and 60 officers being granted out-of-turn promotion for acts of conspicuous gallantry.

Others
Another Special Task Force was constituted by Karnataka and Tamil Nadu to nab forest bandits and sandalwood smugglers.

States of Bihar and Jharkhand also has a Special Task Force.

State of West Bengal & Arunachal Pradesh
Kolkata Police also has a Special Task Force.

West Bengal government  created  new directorate of the Special Task Force under West Bengal Police

Likewise Arunachal Pradesh Police also has a Special Task Force Company formed in the year 2008.

References  

Law enforcement in India
Uttar Pradesh Police